Lakshmi Kataksham is a 1970 Indian Telugu-language swashbuckler film, produced by Pinjala Subba Rao under the P.S.R. Pictures banner and directed by B. Vittalacharya. It stars N. T. Rama Rao and K. R. Vijaya, with music composed by S. P. Kodandapani.

Plot
The story revolves around procuring Lakshmi Bhandagaram. Both the evil forces and kind people fight to procure. Finally, Kulavardhanudu (N. T. Rama Rao), who got Padmarekha on his palm achieves it. He saves his parents and lover Hemamalini (K. R. Vijaya) from the control of Prachanda (Satyanarayana).

Cast
N. T. Rama Rao as Kulavardhanudu
K. R. Vijaya as Rani Hemamalini
Rajasree as Singari
Satyanarayana as Prachandudu
Prabhakar Reddy as
M. Balayya as Vinayadandudu
Mikkilineni 
Balakrishna
Hemalatha 
Jyothi Lakshmi

Soundtrack

Music composed by S. P. Kodandapani.

References

External links
 

1970 films
Indian black-and-white films
1970s fantasy adventure films
Indian fantasy adventure films
Films scored by K. Chakravarthy
1970s Telugu-language films